Ion Gheorghe Pelivan (April 1, 1876 in Răzeni – January 25, 1954 in Sighetu Marmației) was a Romanian politician.

In 1898, Ion Pelivan graduated from the Theological Seminary of Chișinău and in 1903 from the University of Tartu. Then he worked as jurist in Bălți.

Pelivan was the Foreign Minister of Moldova in Pantelimon Erhan Cabinet and Daniel Ciugureanu Cabinet.

External links
 Biography

1876 births
1954 deaths
Romanian people of Moldovan descent
People from Ialoveni District
University of Tartu alumni
Moldovan jurists
Moldovan MPs 1917–1918
Foreign ministers of Moldova
Moldovan anti-communists
Inmates of Sighet prison
Romanian Ministers of Justice
National Moldavian Party politicians
Bessarabian Peasants' Party politicians
Burials at Cernica Monastery Cemetery